MyEdu was a private company founded in 2008 and headquartered in Austin, Texas, United States. MyEdu worked by collecting data from college students, as well as official academic data from universities, to identify patterns that lead to unexpected costs. MyEdu also provided interactive web applications to aid those seeking a college degree, including services that focused on college decision making, such as degree planning & requirements, class schedules, courses, and professors. These services concentrated on helping students organize their academics. MyEdu also offered a job platform for students to search for jobs and internships.

History
MyEdu was founded in 2008 by Michael Crosno, Chris Chilek and John Cunningham. The company, formerly known as Pick-A-Prof, officially changed its name to MyEdu in the summer of 2009, and was acquired by Blackboard in January 2014.

University of Texas connection
On October 18, 2011 the UT System announced a $10 million investment in MyEdu. It admitted the personal connection between MyEdu and the UT System. The co-founder of MyEdu, John Cunningham, is the son of William Cunningham, who is a former UT System chancellor, former UT-Austin president and current faculty member at the McCombs School of Business. William Cunningham has had a financial stake in MyEdu.

The investment agreement designates MyEdu as "a UT System official" with permission to access student records.

Critics have pointed out that the UT decision bypassed vetting by the university's investment advisers.

References

External links

MyEdu Nigeria
Coursicle

Educational technology companies of the United States
Companies based in Austin, Texas